El Niño is a global coupled ocean-atmosphere phenomenon, the warm phase of the El Niño–Southern Oscillation.

El Niño may also refer to:
El Niño (Def Squad album)
El Niño (opera), by American composer John Adams
El Niño (Eldritch album)
El Niño (film)
El Niño, a race car in the video game Need for Speed III: Hot Pursuit
El Niño, a nickname of Spanish golfer Sergio García
El Niño, a nickname of Spanish footballer Fernando Torres
El Niño, a nickname of baseball player Hanley Ramírez
El Niño, a nickname of baseball player Fernando Tatís Jr.
Jordi El Niño Polla (born Ángel Muñoz, 1994), Spanish pornographic actor, producer and internet personality
El Niño, a nickname of hockey player Nino Niederreiter
El Niño, a nickname of mixed martial artist Gilbert Melendez
El Niño, a nickname of Miguel Rafael Martos Sánchez (known as Raphael (singer))
El Niño, a fictional airline of a non-existing country San Escobar
El Niño, a 1998 single by Agnelli & Nelson
1982–83 El Niño event
1997–98 El Niño event

See also 
Nino (disambiguation)
Ill Niño, an American heavy metal band formerly called El Niño
La Niña, ocean-atmosphere phenomenon
Child Jesus